Alan Spartakovich Bagayev (born 7 April 1991) is a Russian football defender. He plays for FC Alania Vladikavkaz.

Club career
He made his debut in the Russian Second Division for FC FAYUR Beslan on 26 April 2011 in a game against FC Rotor Volgograd.

He made his Russian Premier League debut for FC Anzhi Makhachkala on 19 August 2017 in a game against FC Rubin Kazan.

References

External links
 

1991 births
Sportspeople from Vladikavkaz
Living people
Russian footballers
Association football defenders
FC Amkar Perm players
FC Spartak Vladikavkaz players
FC Rostov players
FC Ural Yekaterinburg players
FC Dila Gori players
FC Shukura Kobuleti players
FC Mordovia Saransk players
FC Anzhi Makhachkala players
Russian Premier League players
Russian First League players
Russian Second League players
Erovnuli Liga players
Russian expatriate footballers
Expatriate footballers in Georgia (country)
Russian expatriate sportspeople in Georgia (country)